The Christian Democratic Party (in Spanish: Partido Demócrata Cristiano) is a political party in Peru that surged in 1956. Founded by Ernesto Alayza Grundy, Luis Bedoya Reyes, Mario Polar Ugarteche, Héctor Cornejo Chávez, Roberto Ramírez del Villar and others.

Not having participated in national politics since 1990, the party is currently not registered at the National Jury of Elections to formally participate in future election cycles.

Development
The PDC had its roots in the government of José Bustamante y Rivero who was overthrown in 1948 by Manuel A. Odría although it did not emerge as an organised political party until 1956 when it was one of a number of populist parties formed following Odria's announcement of a new democracy (the other major ones being Popular Action and the Progressive Social Movement). 

The new party gained seats in both houses in the 1956 elections and initially they only concentrated their efforts on the Congress rather than running for the Presidency. A change in policy followed in 1962 when Cornejo was a candidate for the Presidency but he only managed 2.88% of the vote and the party was eliminated from Congress.

As a result of this failure and the coup that overthrew Manuel Prado Ugarteche, the PDC threw in their lot with the Popular Action and as such returned to Congress in 1963 as junior partners in the coalition supporting new President Fernando Belaúnde Terry. The party returned to government as a junior partner in APRA-led government of Alan García, remaining in office until 1990.

Ideology and divisions
The PDC advocated a strong nationalism, a community-minded approach to politics and state interventionism, with a grouping on the left even advocating nationalisation of the oil industry. In the end the right of the party split off in 1966 to set up the Christian People's Party although in the short term at least the majority of the membership remained with the PDC.

Support
The PDC gained a following in Lima to the extent that the party was able to defeat strong candidates from Popular Action and the Odriist National Union in order to have Luis Bedoya Reyes elected Mayor of Lima. In general however the party's prospects were hampered by an anti-clericalism prevalent in Peru and, whilst it gained some support amongst middle class women, it never seriously challenged Popular Action for the centre right vote.

Presidential elections

Bibliography
 Hugo Neira, "Peru" in JP Bernard et al., Guide to the Political Parties of South America, Harmondsworth: Penguin, 1973

References

1956 establishments in Peru
Christian democratic parties in South America
Political parties established in 1956
Political parties in Peru